The Rocky Mountain District can refer to:

Rocky Mountain District (BHS), in the Barbershop Harmony Society
Rocky Mountain District (LCMS), in the Lutheran Church - Missouri Synod